Ko Phaluai (also spelled Koh Phaluai or Koh Paluay) is the biggest island in the Mu Ko Ang Thong island group. It is inhabited by sea-gypsies who still earn a living from fishing.

Details
It is where the capital village of the island chain (Ban Ao Sam) lies.
The Islands size is 19.1 km2 and has a population of 500.
Together with a small portion of land on Ko Samui Island where the town of Bang Makham lies, The Mu Ko Ang Thong islands are part of Ang Thong Subdistrict of Ko Samui District, Surat Thani.

Tourism 
The island is still very new to tourism. There are very few tourists on the island. There are few accommodations as well. There are few home stays and resorts. One of the most famous resort is Angthong Beach Resort.

There are many activities tourists can do on the island:
- Take a tour to Angthong Nation Marine Park
- Take a tour around the island by fisherman's long tail boat
- Fishing tour with local fisherman
- Visit island's view point
- Trekking
- Visit beaches around the island
- Visit fisherman villages
- Kayaking around the island or to Ko Kluai

Table of Islands

See also
 List of islands of Thailand
 Gulf of Thailand
 Surat Thani

Outline of Thailand
List of cities in Thailand
Mu Ko Samui

Notes

References
 

Islands of Thailand
Geography of Surat Thani province
Lists of coordinates
Tourist attractions in Surat Thani province